Barmbek, until 27 September 1946 Barmbeck, is the name of a former village that was absorbed into the city of Hamburg, Germany. In 1951 it was divided into the quarters Barmbek-Süd, Barmbek-Nord and Dulsberg in the borough Hamburg-Nord.

History 
It was first recorded in 1271 as "Bernebeke". Up until 1946 it was written with a 'c' as Barmbeck. Barmbeck and Barmbek are pronounced with a long e, similar to the English "Barm Bake". The village of Barmbeck had been under Hamburg administration since 1830, and it became a suburb of Hamburg in 1894, while the area of Barmbek-Nord was incorporated into Hamburg in 1937 with the Greater Hamburg Act.

Buildings
 near Habichtstraße (Hamburg U-Bahn station)
 St. Sophia's Catholic Church 
 Evangelical–Lutheran Bugenhagenkirche
 AK Barmbek clinic
 AK Eilbek clinic
 Museum of work
 Barmbek station

References

External links

Quarters of Hamburg